López is a surname of Spanish origin. López or Lopez may also refer to:

Fictional characters:
 Lopez, a character in Red vs. Blue; see 
 López (portrayed by Pedro Armendáriz Jr.), a character and antagonist in the 1999 film Herod's Law

In geography:
 Lopez, Cauca, town and municipality in the Cauca Department, Colombia
 Lopez, Quezon, a municipality in the Philippines
 Lopez Jaena, Misamis Occidental, a municipality in the Philippines
 López, Chihuahua, one of the municipalities of Chihuahua, Mexico
 Lopez Island, San Juan Islands, Washington, USA
 Lopez River in Monroe County, Florida
 López (Santa Fe), town and municipality in Santa Fe province, Argentina

Other uses:
 United States v. Lopez, a United States Supreme Court case
 Lopez (TV series), a television series starring George Lopez